Jorge Iván Villalobos Seañez (born 19 July 1978) is a Mexican politician and lawyer affiliated with the PAN. As of 2013 he served as a Deputy in the LXII Legislature of the Mexican Congress representing Sinaloa.

Controversies 
In August 2014, Reporte Indigo published online a video of Villalobos and several other PAN deputies, among them Luis Alberto Villarreal and Máximo Othón Zayas, in a party with exotic dancers at a luxury compound in Puerto Vallarta, Jalisco. Villalobos was subsequently fired from his leadership position in the Chamber of Deputies.

References

1978 births
Living people
People from Chihuahua (state)
21st-century Mexican lawyers
National Action Party (Mexico) politicians
University of Salamanca alumni
21st-century Mexican politicians
Monterrey Institute of Technology and Higher Education alumni
Members of the Chamber of Deputies (Mexico) for Sinaloa